Sorbus parumlobata is a species of plant in the family Rosaceae. It is endemic to Germany.

References

Flora of Germany
parumlobata
Critically endangered plants
Endemic flora of Germany
Taxonomy articles created by Polbot